Calosoma chihuahua is a species of ground beetle in the subfamily of Carabinae. It was described by Gidaspow in 1959.

References

chihuahua
Beetles described in 1959